A cyclosportive, or often simply sportive, is a short to long distance, organised, mass-participation cycling event, typically held annually. The Italian term Gran Fondo is commonly used for these events in the United States, Australia and some other English-speaking countries.

Cyclosportive is short for the French term  (the spelling cyclosportif is sometimes also used but cyclosportive is correct as randonnée is a feminine noun in French).

Many cyclists use sportives to challenge themselves in a personal battle against the distance and then ultimately, the clock. Some participants in a cyclosportive will ride the event like a race, with prizes awarded and considerable prestige for top place finishers, particularly in events like La Marmotte, L'Étape du Tour and the Ardechoise.

A cyclosportive falls between a traditional cycle road race and the more challenging non-competitive randonnée or Audax events. Riders normally carry a number and the time they take to complete the course is recorded. There is usually an upper time limit within which the course must be completed (unlike many randonnée events, there is no lower limit preventing riders from completing the course quickly). The already lengthy course will traditionally include climbs and difficult riding conditions, adding to the merit of the event (e.g. the cobblestones of the Paris–Roubaix).

The routes will usually be well sign-posted and/or marshalled (some cyclosportives take place on roads which have been closed to motor traffic for the duration of the event), riders will be able to use feeding stations positioned at intervals along the route to replenish their food and drink supplies and mechanical and medical support may also be provided. Some attract thousands of participants – since 2000 l'Étape du Tour has offered places to 8,500 riders each year.

Sportive event timings 

Although sportives are not races, entrants' times are usually recorded and sometimes riders are given their finishing position. This can encourage the fastest cyclists to push the pace, with faster riders working together to increase speed in a pro-peloton style. The majority of riders will simply be happy to complete the distance within the time allowance. It is common in France and Italy for prizes to be awarded to the winner and to those winning age-related categories. In the United Kingdom, sportives are not held as races in order to avoid strict rules governing cycle races on public roads.

Established sportive events 

The first ever French cyclosportive was La Marmotte, which was first run in 1982 on a route starting in Le Bourg-d'Oisans and taking in the Col de la Croix de Fer, Col du Télégraphe and Col du Galibier before climbing to finish at the top of one of the most famous Tour de France climbs at Alpe d'Huez. It remains one of the most popular cyclosportive events today in Europe and is often considered to be the hardest cyclosportive.

Arguably the most famous of the cyclosportives today is the French l'Étape du Tour, held each July over a stage of that particular year's Tour de France, usually a mountain stage. This over-subscribed event sees approximately 7,500 riders attempting to emulate the professional cyclists. The Ardéchoise is one of Europe's largest event with 15,000 riders taking part but this time participants are able to choose from a range of circuits, from 66 km to 268 km. The Tour of Flanders had 18,000 participants in its 2007 edition and 17,000 in 2008. Riders can also choose from different circuits including mountainbike courses, from 28 km to 256 km. These events often enjoy roads closed to traffic for the duration of the event, allowing riders to enjoy the full width of the road and to profit from the often technical sections of the route.

Another coveted French event, the Paris–Roubaix Challenge, mimics the legendary one-day classic Paris–Roubaix. Held bi-annually, this  sportive increases the test of reliability and endurance yet further with 26 sections of pavé which total some 42 km (26miles). It is not uncommon for riders to break bikes and even bones over these cobbled roads. Other notable events are the Cape Argus Cycle Tour in South Africa which celebrated its 30th year in 2007 with 40,000 entrants and Italy's Maratona dles Dolomites.

The largest open road cyclosportive in the UK is the Verenti Dragon Ride Wales, held each June over a challenging 200 km mountainous course in South Wales. There are three UK cyclosportives held on closed roads: the annual Etape Caledonia which attracted some 3,500 cyclists in its 2009 edition, follows a route around the Perthshire highlands; the Etape Cymru, first held in October 2011 on North Wales roads including the Horseshoe Pass; and the Prudential RideLondon-Surrey 100 through central London and the Surrey countryside, which in its inaugural run in 2013 was completed by nearly 16,000 riders, and by over 20,000 the next year.

Cyclosportives that are longer than 300 km fit the criteria for ultra-distance cycling events. There is also the Vätternrundan cyclosportive that does a tour of the Swedish lake, which is a route that measures .

In New Zealand, there is the Lake Taupo Cycle Challenge.

Examples of notable cyclosportives
Australia
Around the Bay in a Day
Audax Alpine Classic
Belgium
Tour of Flanders
Liège–Bastogne–Liège
Italy
 Granfondo Milano–Sanremo
 L'Eroica – vintage themed cyclosportive
 Maratona dles Dolomites
Finland
Tour de Helsinki
France
l'Étape du Tour.
La Marmotte.
Time-Megeve-Mont-Blanc
Greece
The Tour of Crete
Ireland
 Wicklow 200
New Zealand
Lake Taupo Cycle Challenge
Norway
Styrkeprøven
South Africa
Pick 'n Pay Cape Argus Cycle Tour 
94.7 Cycle Challenge
Herald Cycle Tour
Pick n Pay Fast One
Amashova Durban Classic Race
Spain
 Quebrantahuesos
Sweden
 Vätternrundan
United Kingdom
Etape du Dales
Fred Whitton Challenge
Great Manchester Cycle
Tour Pour La Mer
 Prudential RideLondon-Surrey 100
United States
King Ridge GranFondo
Sea Otter Classic

See also

Brevet or Randonnée
Challenge riding
UCI Golden Bike
Century ride
Gran Fondo

References

 
Cycling events